KAKU-LP (88.5 FM, "The Voice of Maui County") is a low-power FM radio station broadcasting a variety format. Licensed to Kahului, Hawaii, United States, the station is currently owned by Maui County Community Television. KAKU carries some national programming from Pacifica Radio and other public radio sources and syndicators.

History
The Federal Communications Commission issued a construction permit for the station on September 24, 2003. The station was assigned the KAKU-LP call sign on November 6, 2003, and was granted a license to cover on February 2, 2006.

References

External links

 

AKU-LP
Radio stations established in 2006
AKU-LP
2006 establishments in Hawaii